Seth Dickinson is an American writer of fantasy and science fiction, known for his 2015 debut novel The Traitor Baru Cormorant, as well as its sequels The Monster Baru Cormorant and The Tyrant Baru Cormorant.

Career
Dickinson graduated from the University of Chicago, where he won the Dell Magazines Award for Undergraduate Excellence in Science Fiction and Fantasy Writing in 2011 for his short story "The Immaculate Conception of Private Ritter". He has published short fiction in Clarkesworld, Strange Horizons, Lightspeed and Beneath Ceaseless Skies, among others. He also contributed writing to video games, including Destiny: The Taken King (2015).

His debut novel The Traitor Baru Cormorant, a hard fantasy expansion of a 2011 short story, is about a brilliant young woman who, educated in the schools of the imperial power that subjugated her homeland, sets out to gain power to subvert the empire from within. It was published in September 2015 and was well received by critics. Publishers Weekly appreciated the "seductively complex", ambitious worldbuilding and the "subtle language" of Dickinson's "compelling, utterly surprising narrative". Niall Alexander, writing for Tor.com, characterized the novel as "one of 2015's very finest fantasies" and as "clever and subversive" in the vein of K. J. Parker's best works, highlighting its "intricately crafted narrative and character". At NPR, Amal El-Mohtar praised the "crucial, necessary" novel for its brutality in looking "unflinchingly into the self-replicating virus of empire", noting in particular the unexpectedly "viscerally riveting" portrayal of economic conflict. Dickinson has blogged about addressing issues around gender and feminism, race and homosexuality, as well as imperialism in the world of Baru Cormorant.

Dickinson completed the draft of a sequel, The Monster Baru Cormorant, in July 2017, submitting a manuscript of 1,104 pages. The final version, published in 2018, comprised half of this material. The remainder was published in 2020 as The Tyrant Baru Cormorant, the third novel out of a planned four.

Personal life 
Dickinson has said "I try to be private about matters of identity, in part because I want other writers to know that they don’t have to figure this stuff out in the spotlight; there’s room to keep part of yourself to yourself if you need to, whether for your comfort or your safety."

Bibliography

Novels 
The Masquerade series
 The Traitor Baru Cormorant, 15 September 2015, Tor Books, . Published as The Traitor in the UK. Based on the short story "The Traitor Baru Cormorant, Her Field-General, and Their Wounds" (Beneath Ceaseless Skies, 2011).
 The Monster Baru Cormorant, 30 October 2018, Tor Books, .
 The Tyrant Baru Cormorant, 9 June 2020, Tor Books, 
 A final novel, forthcoming

Short fiction 

Stories

 "Cronus and the Ships" (2013)
 "A Plant (Whose Name is Destroyed)" (2013)
 "Never Dreaming (In Four Burns)" (2013)
 "Testimony Before an Emergency Session of The Naval Cephalopod Command" (2013)
 "Morrigan in the Sunglare" (2014)
 "Sekhmet Hunts the Dying Gnosis: A Computation" (2014)
 "Kumara" (2014)
 "Our Fire, Given Freely" (2014)
 "A Tank Only Fears Four Things" (2014)
 "Anna Saves Them All" (2014)
 "Economies of Force" (2014)
 "Wizard, Cabalist, Ascendant" (2014)
 "Morrigan in Shadow" (2015)
 "Please Undo this Hurt" (2015, from Tor.com)
 "Laws of Night and Silk" (2016, from Beneath-Ceaseless-Skies.com)
 "The Final Order" (2020, from "From a Certain Point of View: The Empire Strikes Back" anthology)

Writing for video games
 FreeSpace 2: Blue Planet (2010)
 Destiny: The Taken King (2015)
 Destiny 2: Forsaken (2018)

External links

References

Year of birth missing (living people)
Living people
21st-century American male writers
21st-century American novelists
American fantasy writers
American male novelists
American science fiction writers
Analog Science Fiction and Fact people
University of Chicago alumni